Caloptilia is a genus of moths in the family Gracillariidae.

Species

Caloptilia acericola Kumata, 1966
Caloptilia acericolella Kuznetzov, 1981
Caloptilia aceriella (Chambers, 1881)
Caloptilia acerifoliella (Chambers, 1875)
Caloptilia aceris Kumata, 1966
Caloptilia acerivorella (Kuznetzov, 1956)
Caloptilia acinata Yuan & Robinson, 1993
Caloptilia acrotherma (Meyrick, 1908)
Caloptilia adelosema (Turner, 1940)
Caloptilia aeneocapitella (Walsingham, 1891)
Caloptilia aeolastis (Meyrick, 1920)
Caloptilia aeolocentra (Meyrick, 1922)
Caloptilia aeolospila (Meyrick, 1938)
Caloptilia agrifoliella Opler, 1971
Caloptilia albospersa (Turner, 1894)
Caloptilia alchimiella (Scopoli, 1763)
Caloptilia alni Kumata, 1966
Caloptilia alnicolella (Chambers, 1875)
Caloptilia alnivorella (Chambers, 1875)
Caloptilia alpherakiella (Krulikovsky, 1909)
Caloptilia amphidelta (Meyrick, 1918)
Caloptilia anthobaphes (Meyrick, 1921)
Caloptilia argalea (Meyrick, 1908)
Caloptilia ariana (Meyrick, 1914)
Caloptilia asplenifoliatella (Darlington, 1949)
Caloptilia atomosella (Zeller, 1873)
Caloptilia auchetidella (Meyrick, 1880)
Caloptilia aurantiaca (Wollaston, 1858)
Caloptilia aurifasciata Kumata, 1982
Caloptilia aurita Triberti, 1989
Caloptilia aurora (Turner, 1894)
Caloptilia auspex (Meyrick, 1912)
Caloptilia azaleella (Brants, 1913)
Caloptilia baringi Yuan & Robinson, 1993
Caloptilia behrensella (Chambers, 1876)
Caloptilia belfragella (Chambers, 1875)
Caloptilia betulicola (M. Hering, 1928)
Caloptilia betulivora (McDunnough, 1946)
Caloptilia bimaculata Liu & Yuan, 1990
Caloptilia bimaculatella (Ely, 1915)
Caloptilia bipunctata Kumata, 1982
Caloptilia bistrigella (Rebel, 1940)
Caloptilia blandella (Clemens, 1864)
Caloptilia braccatella (Staudinger, 1870)
Caloptilia bryonoma (Turner, 1914)
Caloptilia burgessiella (Zeller, 1873)
Caloptilia burserella (Busck, 1900)
Caloptilia callicarpae Kumata, 1982
Caloptilia callichora (Meyrick, 1915)
Caloptilia callicirrha (Meyrick, 1924)
Caloptilia camaronae (Zeller, 1877)
Caloptilia camphorae Kumata, 1982
Caloptilia canadensisella (McDunnough, 1956)
Caloptilia cataractias (Meyrick, 1921)
Caloptilia cecidophora Kumata, 1966
Caloptilia celtidis Kumata, 1982
Caloptilia celtina Vári, 1961
Caloptilia chalcodelta (Meyrick, 1889)
Caloptilia chalcoptera (Meyrick, 1880)
Caloptilia chlorella (Turner, 1894)
Caloptilia chloroptila (Meyrick, 1915)
Caloptilia chrysitis (Felder & Rogenhofer, 1875)
Caloptilia chrysochoa (Meyrick, 1886)
Caloptilia chrysolampra (Meyrick, 1936)
Caloptilia chrysoplaca Vári, 1961
Caloptilia cirrhopis (Meyrick, 1907)
Caloptilia citrochrysa (Meyrick, 1930)
Caloptilia clastopetra (Meyrick, 1928)
Caloptilia columbaepennella (A. Costa, 1839)
Caloptilia cornusella (Ely, 1915)
Caloptilia coroniella (Clemens, 1864)
Caloptilia corrugata (Meyrick, 1918)
Caloptilia coruscans (Walsingham, 1907)
Caloptilia crasiphila (Meyrick, 1912)
Caloptilia crinotibialis Kumata, 1982
Caloptilia crocostola (Turner, 1917)
Caloptilia cruzorum Landry, 2006
Caloptilia cryphia Vári, 1961
Caloptilia cuculipennella (Hübner, 1796)
Caloptilia cyanoxantha (Meyrick, 1920)
Caloptilia dactylifera Liu & Yuan, 1990
Caloptilia deltanthes (Meyrick, 1935)
Caloptilia deltosticta (Meyrick, 1933)
Caloptilia dentata Liu & Yuan, 1990
Caloptilia dicamica Yuan & Robinson, 1993
Caloptilia dicksoni Vári, 1961
Caloptilia diversilobiella Opler, 1969
Caloptilia dogmatica (Meyrick, 1908)
Caloptilia dondavisi Landry, 2006
Caloptilia dubatolovi Baryshnikova, 2007
Caloptilia ecphanes (Turner, 1940)
Caloptilia elaeas (Meyrick, 1911)
Caloptilia elongella (Linnaeus, 1761)
Caloptilia emas Yuan & Robinson, 1993
Caloptilia eolampis (Meyrick, 1915)
Caloptilia etiolata Yuan & Robinson, 1993
Caloptilia euglypta (Turner, 1894)
Caloptilia euhelia Diakonoff, 1955
Caloptilia eurycnema (Turner, 1894)
Caloptilia eurycryptis (Meyrick, 1928)
Caloptilia euryptera (Meyrick, 1908)
Caloptilia eurythiota (Turner, 1913)
Caloptilia euxesta (Turner, 1913)
Caloptilia falconipennella (Hübner, 1813)
Caloptilia fera Triberti, 1989
Caloptilia ferruginella (Braun, 1918)
Caloptilia fidella (Reutti, 1853)
Caloptilia flava (Staudinger, 1871)
Caloptilia flavella (Ely, 1915)
Caloptilia flavida Liu & Yuan, 1990
Caloptilia flavimaculella (Ely, 1915)
Caloptilia fraxinella (Ely, 1915)
Caloptilia fribergensis (Fritzsche, 1871)
Caloptilia galacotra Landry, 2006
Caloptilia garcinicola Liu & Yuan, 1990
Caloptilia geminata Kumata, 1966
Caloptilia gladiatrix (Meyrick, 1922)
Caloptilia gloriosa Kumata, 1966
Caloptilia glutinella (Ely, 1915)
Caloptilia glyphidopis (Meyrick, 1934)
Caloptilia hamulifera Liu & Yuan, 1990
Caloptilia hemiconis (Meyrick, 1894)
Caloptilia hemidactylella ([Denis & Schiffermüller], 1775)
Caloptilia hercoscelis (Meyrick, 1939)
Caloptilia heringi Kumata, 1966
Caloptilia heterocosma (Meyrick, 1931)
Caloptilia hexameris (Meyrick, 1921)
Caloptilia hidakensis Kumata, 1966
Caloptilia hilaropis (Meyrick, 1926)
Caloptilia honoratella (Rebel, 1914)
Caloptilia hypericella (Braun, 1918)
Caloptilia hypodroma Liu & Yuan, 1990
Caloptilia illicii Kumata, 1966
Caloptilia immuricata (Meyrick, 1915)
Caloptilia infaceta Triberti, 1987
Caloptilia ingrata Triberti, 1989
Caloptilia insidia Clarke, 1986
Caloptilia insolita Triberti, 1989
Caloptilia invariabilis (Braun, 1927)
Caloptilia iophanes (Meyrick, 1912)
Caloptilia iorphna (Meyrick, 1939)
Caloptilia iridophanes (Meyrick, 1935)
Caloptilia ischiastris (Meyrick, 1907)
Caloptilia iselaea (Meyrick, 1914)
Caloptilia isochrysa (Meyrick, 1908)
Caloptilia isotoma (Meyrick, 1914)
Caloptilia issikii Kumata, 1982
Caloptilia janeae Bradley, 1965
Caloptilia jasminicola Liu & Yuan, 1990
Caloptilia jelita Yuan & Robinson, 1993
Caloptilia juglandiella (Chambers, 1872)
Caloptilia kadsurae Kumata, 1966
Caloptilia kisoensis Kumata, 1982
Caloptilia koelreutericola Liu & Yuan, 1990
Caloptilia korbiella (Caradja, 1920)
Caloptilia kurokoi Kumata, 1966
Caloptilia laurifoliae (M. Hering, 1927)
Caloptilia leptophanes (Meyrick, 1928)
Caloptilia leptospila Vári, 1961
Caloptilia leucapennella (Stephens, 1835)
Caloptilia leucolitha (Meyrick, 1912)
Caloptilia leucothoes Kumata, 1982
Caloptilia linearis (Butler, 1877)
Caloptilia liparoxantha (Meyrick, 1920)
Caloptilia loxocentra (Turner, 1915)
Caloptilia mabaella (Swezey, 1910)
Caloptilia macranthes (Meyrick, 1928)
Caloptilia macropleura (Meyrick, 1932)
Caloptilia magnifica (Stainton, 1867)
Caloptilia magnoliae Kumata, 1966
Caloptilia mandschurica (Christoph, 1882)
Caloptilia mastopis (Meyrick, 1918)
Caloptilia matsumurai Kumata, 1982
Caloptilia maynei Ghesquière, 1940
Caloptilia megalaurata Legrand, 1965
Caloptilia megalotis (Meyrick, 1908)
Caloptilia melanocarpae (Braun, 1925)
Caloptilia metadoxa (Meyrick, 1908)
Caloptilia meyricki Vári, 1961
Caloptilia minimella (Ely, 1915)
Caloptilia modica Triberti, 1987
Caloptilia monticola Kumata, 1966
Caloptilia murtfeldtella (Busck, 1904)
Caloptilia mutilata (Staudinger, 1880)
Caloptilia negundella (Chambers, 1876)
Caloptilia nobilella (Klimesch, 1942)
Caloptilia nomurai Yuan & Robinson, 1993
Caloptilia nondeterminata (Braun, 1939)
Caloptilia obliquatella (Matsumura, 1931)
Caloptilia obscuripennella (Frey & Boll, 1876)
Caloptilia octopunctata (Turner, 1894)
Caloptilia oenopella (Meyrick, 1880)
Caloptilia onustella (Hübner, 1813)
Caloptilia oriarcha (Meyrick, 1915)
Caloptilia orientalis Ermolaev, 1979
Caloptilia ostracodes (Turner, 1917)
Caloptilia ostryaeella (Chambers, 1878)
Caloptilia ovatiella Opler, 1969
Caloptilia oxydelta (Meyrick, 1908)
Caloptilia pachyspila Bradley, 1965
Caloptilia packardella (Chambers, 1872)
Caloptilia palaearcha (Meyrick, 1930)
Caloptilia pallescens (Staudinger, 1880)
Caloptilia palustriella (Braun, 1910)
Caloptilia panchrista (Turner, 1913)
Caloptilia paradoxum (Frey & Boll, 1873)
Caloptilia parasticta (Meyrick, 1908)
Caloptilia pastranai (Bourquin, 1962)
Caloptilia pedina (Turner, 1923)
Caloptilia pekinensis Liu & Yuan, 1990
Caloptilia peltophanes (Meyrick, 1907)
Caloptilia pentaphylactis (Meyrick, 1938)
Caloptilia pentaplaca (Meyrick, 1911)
Caloptilia perisphena (Meyrick, 1905)
Caloptilia perixesta (Turner, 1913)
Caloptilia perseae (Busck, 1920)
Caloptilia phalaropa (Meyrick, 1912)
Caloptilia phiaropis (Meyrick, 1921)
Caloptilia plagata (Stainton, 1862)
Caloptilia plagiotoma (Turner, 1913)
Caloptilia platycosma (Meyrick, 1912)
Caloptilia pneumatica (Meyrick, 1920)
Caloptilia poecilostola Vári, 1961
Caloptilia populetorum (Zeller, 1839)
Caloptilia populiella (Chambers, 1875)
Caloptilia porphyracma (Meyrick, 1922)
Caloptilia porphyranthes (Meyrick, 1921)
Caloptilia porphyretica (Braun, 1923)
Caloptilia prismatica (Meyrick, 1907)
Caloptilia prosticta (Meyrick, 1909)
Caloptilia protiella (van Deventer, 1904)
Caloptilia pseudoaurita Triberti, 1989
Caloptilia pterostoma (Meyrick, 1922)
Caloptilia ptychospora (Meyrick, 1938)
Caloptilia pulchella (Chambers, 1875)
Caloptilia pulverea Kumata, 1966
Caloptilia pyrrhaspis (Meyrick, 1931)
Caloptilia pyrrhochroma Vári, 1961
Caloptilia quadripunctata Liu & Yuan, 1990
Caloptilia querci (Kumata, 1982)
Caloptilia quercinigrella (Ely, 1915)
Caloptilia recitata (Meyrick, 1918)
Caloptilia reticulata (Braun, 1910)
Caloptilia rhodinella (Herrich-Schäffer, 1855)
Caloptilia rhodorella (McDunnough, 1954)
Caloptilia rhoifoliella (Chambers, 1876)
Caloptilia rhois Kumata, 1982
Caloptilia rhusina Vári, 1961
Caloptilia ribesella (Chambers, 1877)
Caloptilia rjabovi Kuznetzov & Baryshnikova, 2001
Caloptilia robustella Jäckh, 1972
Caloptilia roscipennella (Hübner, 1796)
Caloptilia rufipennella (Hübner, 1796)
Caloptilia ryukyuensis Kumata, 1966
Caloptilia saccisquamata Liu & Yuan, 1990
Caloptilia sachalinella Ermolaev, 1984
Caloptilia sanguinella (Beutenmüller, 1888)
Caloptilia sapiivora Kumata, 1982
Caloptilia sapina Vári, 1961
Caloptilia sapporella (Matsumura, 1931)
Caloptilia sassafrasella (Chambers, 1876)
Caloptilia sassafrasicola Liu & Yuan, 1990
Caloptilia sauzalitoeella (Chambers, 1876)
Caloptilia scaenica Triberti, 1987
Caloptilia scaeodesma (Meyrick, 1928)
Caloptilia scansoria (Meyrick, 1910)
Caloptilia schinusifolia D.R. Davis & Wheeler, 2011
Caloptilia schisandrae Kumata, 1966
Caloptilia scutellariella (Braun, 1923)
Caloptilia scutigera (Meyrick, 1921)
Caloptilia sebastianiella (Busck, 1900)
Caloptilia selenitis (Meyrick, 1909)
Caloptilia selimpat Yuan & Robinson, 1993
Caloptilia semiclausa (Meyrick, 1921)
(Caloptilia semifascia (Haworth, 1828))
Caloptilia semifasciella Kumata, 1966
Caloptilia semnophanes (Meyrick, 1918)
Caloptilia serotinella (Ely, 1910)
Caloptilia sichuanensis Liu & Yuan, 1990
Caloptilia similatella (Zeller, 1877)
Caloptilia soyella (van Deventer, 1904)
Caloptilia speciosella (Braun, 1939)
Caloptilia sphenocrossa (Meyrick, 1934)
Caloptilia spinulosa Liu & Yuan, 1990
Caloptilia staintoni (Wollaston, 1858)
Caloptilia stictocrossa (Turner, 1947)
Caloptilia stigmatella (Fabricius, 1781)
Caloptilia striata Liu & Yuan, 1990
Caloptilia strictella (Walker, 1864)
Caloptilia striolata (Liu & Yuan, 1990)
Caloptilia suberinella (Tengström, 1848)
Caloptilia superbifrontella (Clemens, 1860)
Caloptilia sychnospila Vári, 1961
Caloptilia syngenica Vári, 1961
Caloptilia syrphetias (Meyrick, 1907)
Caloptilia tangkai Yuan & Robinson, 1993
Caloptilia teleodelta (Meyrick, 1926)
Caloptilia teucra (Meyrick, 1933)
Caloptilia theivora (Walsingham, 1891)
Caloptilia thiophylla (Turner, 1913)
Caloptilia thiosema (Turner, 1913)
Caloptilia thymophanes (Meyrick, 1928)
Caloptilia tirantella Legrand, 1965
Caloptilia titanitis (Meyrick, 1921)
Caloptilia tmetica Diakonoff, 1955
Caloptilia triadicae Davis in Davis et al., 2013
Caloptilia tricolor Liu & Yuan, 1990
Caloptilia trimaculiformis Liu & Yuan, 1990
Caloptilia trissochroa (Meyrick, 1931)
Caloptilia ulmi Kumata, 1982
Caloptilia umbratella (Braun, 1927)
Caloptilia vacciniella (Ely, 1915)
Caloptilia variegata Kuznetzov & Baryshnikova, 2001
Caloptilia verecunda Triberti, 2004
Caloptilia vibrans (Meyrick, 1918)
Caloptilia vicinola Vári, 1961
Caloptilia violacella (Clemens, 1860)
Caloptilia viridula (Zeller, 1877)
Caloptilia wakayamensis Kumata, 1966
Caloptilia xanthocephala Vári, 1961
Caloptilia xanthochiria Vári, 1961
Caloptilia xanthopharella (Meyrick, 1880)
Caloptilia xylophanes (Turner, 1894)
Caloptilia xystophanes (Turner, 1913)
Caloptilia yasudai Kumata, 1982
Caloptilia zachrysa (Meyrick, 1907)
Caloptilia zonotarsa (Meyrick, 1936)

References

External links
 http://www.gracillariidae.net - Global Taxonomic Database of Gracillariidae (Lepidoptera)

 
Gracillariinae
Gracillarioidea genera
Taxa named by Jacob Hübner